Oleg Vyacheslavovich Sergeyev (born 29 March 1968) is a Russian football coach and a former player. He is an assistant manager with FC Chayka Peschanokopskoye.

Honours
 Soviet Premier League winner: 1991.
 Soviet Premier League runner-up: 1990.
 Russian Premier League runner-up: 1996.
 Soviet Cup winner: 1991.
 Soviet Cup runner-up: 1992.
 Russian Cup runner-up: 1993, 1994, 1997.

International career
Sergeyev made his debut for USSR on 23 May 1991 in a friendly against Argentina. He scored both of his national team goals in friendlies against the United States: for CIS on 2 February 1992 and for Russia on 13 February 1993. He was not selected for the UEFA Euro 1992 squad.

References
 Player profile 

1968 births
Living people
Soviet footballers
Association football forwards
Soviet Union international footballers
Russian footballers
Russia international footballers
Russian expatriate footballers
Sportspeople from Volgograd
Expatriate footballers in Qatar
Soviet Top League players
Russian Premier League players
FC Rotor Volgograd players
PFC CSKA Moscow players
Ittihad FC players
FC Spartak Vladikavkaz players
FC Dynamo Moscow players
FC Lokomotiv Moscow players
FC Moscow players
Al-Gharafa SC players
FC Baltika Kaliningrad players
FC Asmaral Moscow players
Dual internationalists (football)
Russian football managers
FC Salyut Belgorod players
FC Metallurg Lipetsk players
Russian expatriate football managers
Expatriate football managers in North Macedonia